The following table gives detailed results of the games played by Olympique Lyonnais (Lyon), since the 1959–60 season, in European football competitions (European Cup/UEFA Champions League, UEFA Cup/UEFA Europa League, Inter-Cities Fairs Cup and UEFA Cup Winners' Cup).

Results 
Statistics are as of the 2021–22 season.

By competition
Information correct as of 3 May 2018.

Note: Lyon score always listed first.

 po = Play-off
 p = Penalty shoot-out
 a.e.t. = After extra time
 a = Away goals rule
 c = Coin toss

References 

Olympique Lyonnais
Lyon